Aram Tigran or Aramê Dîkran (Kurdish rendering from Western Armenian), born Aram Melikyan, (1934 – 8 August 2009) was a contemporary Armenian singer who sang primarily in Kurdish. Among Assyrians in Qamishli he was known as Aram Dikran.

Tigran was born in Qamishli in northeastern Syria to an Armenian family originally from Diyarbakır, Turkey. Both of his parents were born in villages near the city Diyarbakır. His first Oud he received from his uncle at the age of six. After finishing ninth grade, he concentrated his efforts on learning music and playing Oud and in 1953 he gave his first public concert at the Newroz celebrations. By the age of twenty years, he was singing in four languages: Kurdish, Arabic, Syriac and Armenian. In 1966 he moved to Yerevan, Armenia, at the time a part of the Soviet Union, where he was a employed for eighteen years at Radio Yerevan. He left Armenia in 1995 and settled in Athens. He is considered among the best of contemporary Kurdish singers and musicians. He recorded 230 songs in Kurdish, 150 in Arabic, 10 in Syriac, 8 in Greek. In 2009 he was able to visit the villages, where his parents grew up in the Ottoman Empire (present day Turkey), where he was welcomed in Diyarbakır and gave a concert at the Newroz celebrations in Batman.

Tigran died in Athens on August 8, 2009, in the Evangelismos General Hospital. Tigran wanted to be buried in Diyarbakır in Turkey, an aim supported by the pro-Kurdish Democratic Society Party (DTP), but the Turkish Ministry of the Interior refused this request, on grounds that he was not a Turkish citizen. Instead he was buried in Brussels, Cimetery of Jette and some soil from Diyarbakır was poured into his grave.

He was married and had three children.

Albums
Çîyayê Gebarê, Aydın Müzik, 2004.
Zîlan, Aydın Müzik, 2004.
Serxwebûn Xweş E, Aydın Müzik, 2004.
Kurdistan, Aydın Müzik, 2004
Xazî Dîsa Zarbûma
Rabin
Evîna Feqiyê Teyran
Keçê Dinê
Ey Welato Em Heliyan
Ay dilberê
Daye min berde
Diyarbekira serin
Aydil
Em hatin
Heval Ferat

Notes

20th-century Armenian male singers
Syrian people of Armenian descent
1934 births
2009 deaths
Kurdish-language singers
People from Qamishli